Goniurosaurus hainanensis, also known as the “Chinese Cave Gecko”  is a nocturnal species of gecko endemic to the Hainan Island of China. Its common name is the Chinese cave gecko, Hainan Cave Gecko or simply cave gecko. The exotic pet trade has been driving numbers of this rare species down since its categorization in the early 2000s, and could eventually lead to its extinction. In recent years, the population has stabilized.

Characteristics 
They can grow to sizes reaching over 23 centimeters (9 in) long, but often average around 8.5 inches. and are often found dwelling on the sides of rock formations and forest floors. They have typically large red eyes, ranging from maroon to crimson, with movable eyelids much like the more widely known leopard gecko, another member of the family Eublepharidae. In terms of color, these animals are usually gray with black spots and yellow or orange bands in the dorsal area. Some individuals lose their coloring with age, and wind up a nearly solid gray color. Ventral area is nearly white and translucent. Five clawed fingers allow easy climbing of rocky terrain and rainforrest clifs. They prefer high humidity and low temperatures of 22–25 °C. Goniurosaurus geckos lack adhesive toepads.

The main source of food for these lizards are small arthropods such as roaches, crickets and other insects.

Captivity 
Since the 1990s these lizards can often be found at various reptile shows or online animal shops. They are the only Goniurosaurus species regularly available in the commercial pet trade, and captive bred individuals have become the standard for potential owners. This exotic pet trade has been driving poaching and leaves wild populations at risk of extinction. Currently, hainanensis is the only recorded Goniurosaurus species that is neither vulnerable nor endangered, having a stable population when assessed in 2019.

Most climates aren't suitable for these lizards, so in captivity they require daily misting. They are shy and need enough hiding places and space for adult animals. They are rarely seen during the day, but can tolerate minimal handling. They thrive in small groups, but multiple males tend to be territorial and fight. Problems with shedding are common and often the main cause of death.

References

Goniurosaurus
Reptiles of China
Endemic fauna of Hainan
Reptiles described in 1908
Taxa named by Thomas Barbour
Species endangered by the pet trade